Isaac Smith Tallmadge (born May 31, 1824; died before 1893) was an American lawyer and served two terms in the Wisconsin State Assembly, representing central Fond du Lac County.

Biography

Isaac Tallmadge was born on May 31, 1824, in New York. He was the son of Nathaniel P. Tallmadge, who served as United States Senator from New York and Governor of the Wisconsin Territory.  He graduated from Union College in 1842 and married Cornelia Ruggles in 1847.  In 1849 and 1855, he was elected district attorney of Fond du Lac County, Wisconsin, and in 1853 he served in the Wisconsin State Assembly, representing Fond du Lac County.  In 1859 he was the Democratic candidate for Wisconsin circuit court in the 4th circuit, but was defeated by David Taylor.

Sometime after 1859, he moved to New York City and practiced law.

References

|-

Members of the Wisconsin State Assembly
1824 births
Year of death missing
Politicians from Fond du Lac, Wisconsin
Wisconsin lawyers